Saint-Vincent-Sterlanges is a commune in the Vendée department in the Pays de la Loire region in western France.

Geography
Saint-Vincent-Sterlanges lies in the Vendée département at thirty kilometers far from La Roche-sur-Yon. Le Petit Lay flaws in Saint-Vincent-Sterlanges and forms the coastal river le Lay by meeting le Grand Lay in Chantonnay.

See also
Communes of the Vendée department

References

Communes of Vendée